A forest park is a park whose main theme is its forest of trees. Forest parks are found both in the mountains and in the urban environment.

Examples

Chile 
Forest Park, Santiago

China
Gongqing Forest Park, Shanghai
Mufushan National Forest Park, Hunan Province
Zhangjiajie National Forest Park, Hunan Province
Longwanqun National Forest Park, Jilin Province
Huishan National Forest Park, Jiangsu Province
Xishan Forest Park, Yunnan Province

The Gambia

Bamakuno Forest Park
etc.

Germany
Bavarian Forest National Park
Black Forest National Park

Iran
Lavizan Forest Park

Japan
Aichiken Forest Park (Nagoya, Aichi)
Musashi Kyūryō National Government Park (Namegawa, Saitama)

New Zealand
The Catlins

Russia
Bitsevsky Forest Park, Moscow
Troparevsky Forest Park, Moscow

Taiwan
Daan Forest Park
Luodong Forestry Culture Park
Taitung Forest Park
Youchang Forest Park

United Kingdom
Brierley Forest Park, England
Argyll Forest Park, Scotland

United States
Forest Park Nature Center, Peoria, Illinois
Forest Park (Springfield, Massachusetts)
Forest Park, St. Louis, Missouri
Forest Park, Queens, New York City, New York
Forest Park (Portland, Oregon)
Forest Park, Everett, Washington

See also 
Forest
Park

References

External links 

 
Forests